Heart Beat  is the second studio album by German band Bad Boys Blue released on 19 October 1986 by Coconut Records. The album includes two international hits: "I Wanna Hear Your Heartbeat (Sunday Girl)" and "Kisses and Tears (My One and Only)". Three singles were released from the record. Sometimes the name of the album is spelled as Heartbeat. 

Hans-Jürgen Fritz, who once played keyboards for the german prog band Triumvirat, plays synthesizers on the album, he also wrote and composed one song and did the arrangements on all songs with Tony Hendrik.

Track listing
"I Wanna Hear Your Heartbeat (Sunday Girl)" – 3:50
"Mon Amie" – 4:35
"One Night In Heaven" – 4:45
"Baby I Love You" – 4:05 (Jeff Barry, Ellie Greenwich, Phil Spector)
"Kisses & Tears (My One and Only)" – 3:58
"Rainy Friday" – 4:35
"Lady Blue" – 4:29
"Love Really Hurts Without You" – 3:44
"Blue Moon" – 4:32
"Dance the Night Away" – 4:20

Personnel
Bad Boys Blue
Trevor Taylor – lead vocal (all tracks)
Andrew Thomas - lead vocals and backing vocals
John McInerney - lead vocals and backing vocals

Additional personnel 
Hans-Jürgen Fritz – synthesizers - Used to be the keyboardist for the german prog band Triumvirat.
Günter Lammers – synthesizers
John Parsons – electric guitar
Tony Hendrik – drum machine

Credits
All tracks written by T. Hendrik and K. van Haaren except 3 written by H.-J. Fritz and 4 written by Spector, Greenwich, and Berry
5 written by T. Hendrik, K. van Haaren, and M. Applegate
8 written by Findon and Charles
Recorded and mixed at Studio Rüssmann, Hennef, Germany.
All songs arranged by T. Hendrik and H.-J. Fritz
Produced by Tony Hendrik and Karin Hartmann

References

External links
ALBUM - Heartbeat
Bad Boys Blue - Heartbeat
Bad Boys Blue - Baby I Love You Lyrics

1986 albums
Bad Boys Blue albums